Sigtuna is a locality situated in Sigtuna Municipality, Stockholm County, Sweden with 8,444 inhabitants in 2010. It is the namesake of the municipality even though the seat is in Märsta.
Sigtuna is for historical reasons often still referred to as a stad.

Modern-day Sigtuna, a harbor town that was established around 980, developed approximately 4 kilometres east of Old Sigtuna (which, according to Norse mythology, was previously the home of Odin).

Sigtuna has a medieval-style town centre with restaurants, cafes and small shops. The old church ruins, runic stones and the old main street (Stora gatan) are popular attractions for tourists, especially in the summertime. The small streets with low-built wooden houses lead up to several handicrafts shops and the old tiny town hall (Sigtuna Rådhus). There are restaurants and Sigtuna Stadshotell, a hotel in the town centre.

Geography 
Sigtuna is situated at the bay Skarven, stretching around Upplands-Bro and a part of Lake Mälaren.

Etymology
The name of Sigtuna was moved from what is presently called Signhildsberg. The meaning of Sigtuna is contested. According to one theory, it is a compound name where the second element is -tuna and the first one is either of two closely related dialectal words, viz. sig meaning "seeping water" or "swamp" or sik meaning "swamp". As a basis for this interpretation, a brook south of Signhildsberg has been mentioned, or the fact that the estate was surrounded by marshy terrain. 

Another theory considers the name to be an ancient prestigious "wander toponym", meaning "strong fortress", like the Celtic toponym Segodunum,  from Proto-Germanic *sigatūna, Old Norse Sigtún, cf. Proto-Germanic *segaz ~ *sigiz- "victory": Gothic sigis, Old Norse sigr, Old English sigor, Old Frisian sige, sīge, Old High German sigi, sigu.

History 
Sigtuna was founded on what was then the shore of Lake Mälaren just over 1,000 years ago. It took its name from an ancient royal estate (see Uppsala öd) several kilometers to the west (see Fornsigtuna). Various sources claim King Eric the Victorious as founder while others claim King Olof Skötkonung.

It operated as a royal and commercial centre for some 250 years, and was one of the most important cities of Sweden.  During a brief period at the end of the 10th and beginning of the 11th century, Sweden's first coins were minted here. St. Mary's Church, built in the 13th century by the Dominican order as a monastery church, still remains largely intact. The Dominican monastery played an important role in the Swedish Middle Ages and produced many important church officials, among them many Swedish archbishops. Many church and monastery ruins still stand, including St. Pers Church  (S:t Pers kyrkoruin) dating the 1100s, St. Olof Church (S:t Olofs kyrkoruin) dated from around the middle of the 11th century, and  St. Lars Church   (S:t Lars kyrkoruin) dating from the middle of the 13th century.

In 1187 Sigtuna was attacked and pillaged by raiders from across the Baltic Sea and Novgorod, possibly Karelians, Curonian and/or Estonian (Oeselian) raiders.<ref name=Tarvel>Enn Tarvel (2007). [http://haridus.opleht.ee/Arhiiv/7_82007/38-41.pdf Sigtuna hukkumine.]  Haridus, 2007 (7-8), p 38–41</ref> Archaeological excavations have not verified the traditions of destruction of the town. Normal life in Sigtuna continued until the town started to slowly lose its importance during the 13th century due to navigability problems caused by post-glacial rebound.

The current coat of arms can be traced to the town's first known seal, dating from 1311. According to a legend (possibly inspired by the town arms), Sigtuna was once the Royal seat, but this cannot be confirmed. The crown may also symbolize the large royal mint which was located in the town. Since 1971 the coat of arms has been valid for the much larger Sigtuna Municipality.

In the late 19th century Sigtuna still hosted only about 600 people, and was the smallest town in Sweden. The town remained insignificant until the second half of the 20th century. Much of the population growth can be related to Stockholm Arlanda Airport (IATA: ARN), situated some 10 km from Sigtuna.

Gallery

 Sports 
Sigtuna IF, sports club

 See also 
 Sigtunaskolan Humanistiska Läroverket, a famous boarding school.
 Luodian is a replica of Sigtuna located in Shanghai

 Notes 

 References 
  "Sigtuna" from Nordisk familjebok
Related reading
Tesch, Sten; Jacques Vincent (2003) Vyer från medeltidens Sigtuna'' (Sigtuna Museum) 
Hjorth, Agnete; Edéus, Anne-Marie (2006) Sigtunabilder : hus och människor i gamla Sigtuna (Svartsjö: Förlag Agnete Hjorth)

External links 

Sigtuna Municipality official website
Sigtuna museum website

Populated places in Sigtuna Municipality
Histories of cities in Sweden
Viking Age populated places
Sigtuna Municipality
980 establishments
10th-century establishments in Sweden